Ilhéu Rabo de Junco is an uninhabited islet near the west coast of Sal Island, Cape Verde. It is the only islet near the island of Sal. Baía da Murdeira lies to the southeast of the islet. The islet is part of the marine nature reserve Baía da Murdeira.

References

Uninhabited islands of Cape Verde
Geography of Sal, Cape Verde